A superstate is defined as "a large and powerful state formed when several smaller countries unite", or "A large and powerful state formed from a federation or union of nations", or "a hybrid form of polity that combines features of
ancient empires and modern states."
This is distinct from the concept of superpower, although these are sometimes seen together.

Use 
In the early 20th century, "superstate" had a similar definition as today's supranational organisations. In a 1927 article by Edward A. Harriman on the League of Nations, a superstate was defined as merely "an organisation, of which a state is a member, which is superior to the member themselves", in that "[a] complete superstate has legislative, executive and judicial organs to make, to execute and to interpret its laws". According to this definition, Harriman saw the League of Nations as a "rudimentary superstate", and the United States of America as "an example of a complete and perfect superstate".

In World Order of Bahá'u'lláh, first published in 1938, Shoghi Effendi, the Guardian of the Baháʼí Faith, described the anticipated world government of that religion as the "world’s future super-state" with the Baháʼí Faith as the "State Religion of an independent and Sovereign Power."

In the 1970s, academic literature used the term "superstate" to indicate a particularly rich and powerful state, in a similar fashion to the term superpower.

In contemporary political debate, especially the one centred on the European Union, the term "superstate" is used to indicate a development in which the Union develops from its current de facto status as a confederation to become a fully-fledged federation, known as the United States of Europe.
For instance, Glyn Morgan contrasts the perspective of a "European superstate" to the ones of "a Europe of nation-states" and of "a post-sovereign European polity". In her definition, a "European superstate is nothing more than a sovereign state - a tried and tested type of polity that predominates in the modern world - operating on a European wide scale", i.e., "a unitary European state". Especially after the European debt crisis, economic literature started to discuss the role of European union as a European superstate. In particular, they compared the emergence of a debt union to the federal structure of Germany. 

The term was famously used by Margaret Thatcher in her 1988 Bruges speech, when she decried the perspective of "a European super-state exercising a new dominance from Brussels", and has since entered the eurosceptic lexicon.
Tony Blair argued in 2000 that he welcomed an EU as a "superpower, not a superstate".

In a 2022 study, Alasdair Roberts argues that superstates should be construed as hybrid forms of political organization: "Every superstate carries the burdens of statehood, that is, the duties of intensive governance and respect for human rights that are carried by all modern states. But superstates also carry the burdens of empire, principally the burden of holding together a large and diverse population spread across a vast territory. Superstates are distinguished from ordinary states by problems of governance that are intensified by scale, diversity, and complexity". In this view, a superstate need not be highly centralized, just as some empires were not highly centralized. Thus is it possible to describe the European Union as a superstate without conceding that is a "centralized, unitary leviathan".

Fictional superstates
Atlantic Federation (Gundam anime metaseries)
The Alliance for Democracy in The Domination, which originated as a military alliance before being unified into a single nation.
Earth Alliance in:
 Babylon 5
 The History of Galaxy novel series
Eastasia, Eurasia and Oceania in Nineteen Eighty-Four
Federation of the Americas from Call of Duty: Ghosts
 Gundam in the Cosmic Era timeline of Mobile Suit Gundam SEED
Interstellar Alliance (Babylon 5)
Fleet of Worlds
Galactic Empire (Star Wars)
Galactic Empire (Isaac Asimov universe)
Galactic Republic
Imperium of Mankind
Mega-City One
Meccania
United Federation of Planets
The Dominion (Star Trek)
The World State
Unified Earth Government from Halo
United States of Africa
United States of Europe
United Nations (Of Earth) from The Expanse
The Outer Planets Alliance (OPA) from The Expanse
Tamrielic Empire (Septim Dynasty) from The Elder Scrolls

See also
China
Imperial Federation
India
List of countries and dependencies by area
Organization of American States
Soviet Union
United States

Notes 

Federalism
Political science terminology
Political systems